Sopater of Apamea (died before 337 AD) was a distinguished sophist and Neoplatonist philosopher.

Biography
Sopater was a disciple of Iamblichus, after whose death (c. 325 AD), he went to Constantinople, where he enjoyed the favour and personal friendship of Constantine I.

The Suda lists that he wrote variety of works, including one On Providence, and another called People who have Undeserved Good or Bad Fortune.  He is distinguished from another sophist of that name "Of Apamea ... (Or rather, of Alexandria)", who wrote epitomes of very many authors and probably also the Historical Extracts, of which Photius has preserved a summary, from which it appears that it contained a vast variety of fact and fiction, collected from a great number of authors.

The most significant work attributed to Sopater is the Diairesis Zetematon (Division of Questions), which is a collection of 81 declamation themes, as well as containing instructions on how they are to be treated. This text gives the best insight to modern scholars on how  rhetorics and their pupils worked in the schools. 

Sozomenus relates "an invention of persons who desired to vilify the Christian religion", that Constantine asked Sopater for purification after having killed his son Crispus and that Sopater denied him.

Sopater was one of many who were put to death by Constantine, sometime before 337 AD. Zosimus ascribes his death to the machinations of Ablabius. Eunapius further alleges that Sopater was charged by Constantine through the deception of Ablabius with detaining through magical arts a fleet laden with grain to stop Constantinople, the capital of the empire and Constantine's own home, from receiving food stocks.

Notes

References

External links
Eunapius, Lives of the Sophists
Photius' Bibliotheca   Cod. 161 at The Tertullian Project
 Sigma 845 in Suda On Line project
 Sigma 848 in  Suda On Line project 

4th-century Romans
4th-century philosophers
Neoplatonists
Roman-era Sophists
4th-century executions
Executed philosophers
4th-century writers